The Government of Ireland is the cabinet that exercises executive authority in Ireland.

The Taoiseach must be nominated by the Dáil, the house of representatives. The Government is also known as the cabinet.

It was formed after protracted government negotiations following a general election on 8 February 2020.

Government
Membership of the cabinet is regulated by Article 28 of the Constitution of Ireland and by the Ministers and Secretaries Acts 1924 to 2017. The Constitution requires the government to consist of between seven and fifteen members, all of whom must be a member of the Oireachtas.

Since the formation of the 12th Government of Ireland in 1966, all Irish cabinets have been formed with the constitutional maximum of fifteen ministers. The total sometimes falls below this number for brief periods following the resignation of individual ministers or the withdrawal of a party from a coalition.

All other members of the cabinet must be members of Dáil Éireann, the house of representatives. The Taoiseach, Tánaiste and Minister for Finance must be members of the Dáil. In practice, however, the members of the cabinet are invariably members of the Dáil. Since the adoption of the 1937 constitution, only two ministers have been appointed from the Seanad: Seán Moylan who served in 1957 as Minister for Agriculture and James Dooge who served as Minister for Foreign Affairs from 1981 to 1982. Joseph Connolly, a member of the Free State Seanad, had served in the Executive Council of the Irish Free State from 1932 to 1933 as Minister for Posts and Telegraphs, and from 1933 to 1936 as Minister for Lands and Fisheries.

A member of the government in charge of a Department of State is designated a Minister of the Government (before 1977 this position was termed Minister of State). For distinction, Ministers of State (known before 1977 as Parliamentary Secretaries) – informally called junior ministers – are not Ministers of the Government, but assist those Ministers in their Departments. A minister without portfolio may be appointed to the Government who is not the head of a Department of State; this occurred during the period known in Ireland as the Emergency when Frank Aiken served as Minister for the Co-ordination of Defensive Measures from 1939 until 1945. The functions of government ministers are frequently transferred between departments during cabinet reshuffles or after elections. On occasion, a department of state will cease to exist, its functions being transferred to another department. Such defunct ministerial positions include the Ministers for Labour, Posts and Telegraphs, Public Service and Supplies.

Non-members attending cabinet
Non-members have no voting rights at Cabinet but may otherwise participate fully, and normally receive circulated Cabinet papers on the same basis as a full member of Government. Votes are rare, however, with the cabinet usually following the Taoiseach or working by consensus.

The Government is advised by the Attorney General, who is not formally a member of the Government, but who participates in cabinet meetings as part of their role as legal advisor to the Government.

The Chief Whip may attend meetings of the cabinet, but is not a member of the Government. In addition, the Government can select other Ministers of State who may attend cabinet meetings. Up to three Ministers of State who regularly attend cabinet meetings may receive an allowance. This person is informally known as a "super junior minister". Currently Jack Chambers, Hildegarde Naughton and Pippa Hackett are Ministers of State who attend cabinet. Trinity College Dublin law professor Oran Doyle has argued that this practice breaches cabinet confidentiality as required by the Constitution.

Term of office
A new government is formed by the Taoiseach appointed after each general election after receiving the nomination of the Dáil. All members of the government are deemed to have resigned on the resignation of the Taoiseach. Therefore, a new government is appointed where there is a new Taoiseach within a single Dáil term. The Constitution allows a Dáil term of no more than seven years, but a shorter period may be specified by law; this has been set as a maximum of five years. The Taoiseach may at any time advise the President to dissolve the Dáil, prompting a new general election. The President retains absolute discretion to refuse to grant a dissolution to a Taoiseach who has lost the confidence of the Dáil. To date, no President has refused the request of a Taoiseach to dissolve the Dáil.

The Taoiseach must retain the confidence of Dáil Éireann to remain in office. If the Taoiseach ceases "to retain the support of a majority in Dáil Éireann", the Taoiseach must resign unless they seek a dissolution of the Dáil which is granted by the President. This applies only in cases of a motion of no confidence or loss of supply (rejection of a budget), rather than the defeat of the government in other legislation or Dáil votes.

The Taoiseach can direct the President to dismiss or accept the resignation of individual ministers. When the Taoiseach resigns, the entire Government is deemed to have resigned as a collective. However, in such a scenario, according to the Constitution, "the Taoiseach and the other members of the Government shall continue to carry on their duties until their successors shall have been appointed".

On the dissolution of Dáil Éireann, ministers are no longer members of the Oireachtas. However, the Constitution also provides that "the members of the Government in the office at the date of a dissolution of Dáil Éireann shall continue to hold office until their successors shall have been appointed".

Caretaker Government
Where the resignation of the Taoiseach and government is not immediately followed by the appointment by the president of a new Taoiseach on the nomination of the Dáil, the outgoing government continues as a caretaker government to "carry out their duties until their successors have been appointed". This has happened when no candidate was nominated for Taoiseach when the Dáil first assembled after a general election, or, on one occasion, where a Taoiseach had lost the confidence of the Dáil, but there was not a dissolution of the Dáil followed by a general election.

Authority and powers
In some other parliamentary regimes, the head of state is the nominal chief executive, though bound by convention to act on the advice of the cabinet. In Ireland, however, the Constitution explicitly vests executive authority in the Government, not the President.

The executive authority of the Government is subject to certain limitations. In particular:
The state may not declare war, or participate in a war, without the consent of the Dáil. In the case of "actual invasion", however, "the Government may take whatever steps they may consider necessary for the protection of the State".

Government ministers are collectively responsible for the actions of the government. Each minister is responsible for the actions of his or her department. Departments of State do not have legal personalities. Actions of departments are carried out under the title of ministers even, as is commonly the case when the minister has little knowledge of the details of these actions. This contradicts the rule in common law that a person given a statutory power cannot delegate that power. This leads to a phrase in correspondence by government departments, "the Minister has directed me to write", on letters or documents that the minister in question may never have seen.

Ministers who fail to comply may, ultimately, be found to be in contempt of court, and even imprisoned.

History
Prior to independence, the executive of the unilaterally declared Irish Republic was the Ministry of Dáil Éireann. This was in operation from 1919 to 1922. After the approval of the Anglo-Irish Treaty in January 1922, a Provisional Government of Ireland was established as the executive. The personnel of the Provisional Government overlapped with the Ministry of Dáil Éireann, but they were not identical. On the independence of the Irish Free State on 6 December 1922, both executives were succeeded by the Executive Council of the Irish Free State. On 29 December 1937, on the coming into force of the Constitution of Ireland, the Eighth Executive Council of the Irish Free State became the First Government of Ireland.

The detail and structure of the Government of Ireland has its legislative basis in the Ministers and Secretaries Act 1924; it has been amended on a number occasions, and these may be cited together as the Ministers and Secretaries Acts 1924 to 2017 and are construed together as one Act.

All Governments from 1989 to 2020 were coalitions of two or more parties. The first coalition government was formed in 1948. The Taoiseach has almost always been the leader of the largest party in the coalition, with John A. Costello, Taoiseach from 1948 to 1951 and from 1954 to 1957, the only exception to this rule.

Public service

The public service in Ireland refers to the totality of public administration in Ireland. As of Q3, 2016 the total number of employees in the Irish public service stands at 304,472 people. The Department of Public Expenditure, National Development Plan Delivery and Reform defines the public service as comprising seven sectors: the Civil Service, Defence Sector, Education Sector, Health Sector, Justice Sector, Local Authorities and Non-Commercial State Agencies; such as Bord Bia, IDA Ireland and the Commission for Energy Regulation.  Commercial state-owned bodies such as RTÉ, ESB Group and An Post are not considered part of the public service in Ireland.

The largest sector is the health sector with over 105,000 employees (largely in the Health Service Executive), followed by the education sector with approximately 98,450.

Public service employees

Largest single public sector bodies by employees

Civil service

The civil service of Ireland consists of two broad components, the Civil Service of the Government and the Civil Service of the State. While this partition is largely theoretical, the two parts do have some fundamental operational differences. The civil service is expected to maintain political impartiality in its work, and some parts of it are entirely independent of Government decision making.

Current Government of Ireland

Leo Varadkar was nominated as Taoiseach for a second time by Dáil Éireann on 17 December 2022 and appointed by the president. Varadkar proposed the nomination of the members of government, and after their approval by the Dáil, they were appointed by the president.

See also
Irish cabinets since 1919
Politics of the Republic of Ireland

References

External links

Merrionstreet.ie Irish Government News Service
List of ministers and ministers of state
Ireland's Government and Economy at EuroLearn.org 

Politics of the Republic of Ireland
Ireland